is a railway station on the Hakone Tozan Line located in Hakone, Kanagawa Prefecture, Japan. It is 13.4 rail kilometers from the line's terminus at Odawara Station.

History
Kowakidani Station was opened on June 1, 1919.

Lines
Hakone Tozan Railway
Hakone Tozan Line

Building
Kowakidani Station has two opposed side platforms.

Platforms

Bus Services
 Hakone Tozan Bus
"H" line for Hakone Machi Ko (Lake Ashi) via Kowaki-en, Moto Hakone Ko (Hakone Shrine: Transfer for Sightseeing Cruise)and Hakone Checkpoint
"H" line for Hakone Yumoto Station and Odawara Station, via Miyanoshita and Ohiradai Station
 Izu Hakone Bus
"J" line for Kojiri via Kowaki-en and Ōwakudani
"Z" line for Hakone Checkpoint via Kowaki-en and Moto Hakone (Hakone Shrine)
"J" & "Z" line for Hakone Yumoto Station and Odawara Station, via Miyanoshita and Ohiradai Station

References

External links
 Hakone Tozan Railway Official Site
 Hakone Tozan Bus Official Site

Railway stations in Japan opened in 1919
Railway stations in Kanagawa Prefecture
Buildings and structures in Hakone, Kanagawa